Fernando Cisneros Carrillo (August 25, 1932 – August 27, 2010), was a Mexican luchador or professional wrestler known under the ring name Espanto II ("Terror 2"). For most of his career he was closely associated with his tag team partner and close friend José Vázquez, better known as Espanto I as well as Miguel Vázquez known as Espanto III, with the three collectively known as Los Espantos

During his professional wrestling career Carillo held the Mexican National Tag Team Championship with Espanto I and the Northern Tag Team Championship with Espanto III. He lost his mask to Rubén Juárez in 1963 as a result a Lucha de Apuestas, or "bet match". In 2010 he was inducted into the Ciudad Juárez Lucha Libre Hall of Fame along with the other two Espantos. The team of Espanto I and Espanto II are considered among the best rudo (those that portray the bad guys) teams in the history of lucha libre.

Early life
Fernando Cisneros Carrillo was born on August 25, 1932, son of Edgardo Cisneros Díaz Isabel Carrillo Iñiguez in the Lagunero town of Torreón, Coahuila, Mexico. While in school Cisneros met and befriended José Eusebio Vázquez Bernal, a friendship that was close that they considered each other's brothers. The friendship between the two was so strong that Cisneros' parents considered Vázquez as one of their own children. After leaving school they both went their separate ways, not seeing each other for two years, before they both ended up training at the same boxing gym where Cisnero met with some success as a Golden Gloves boxer. Cisnero was also an avid cyclist, having participated in the first ever Vuelta Coahuila bicycle race. Late in life he credited training as a boxer and cyclist for his stamina in the ring.

Professional wrestling career
Initially he had been trained for Olympic style wrestling as well as Greco-Roman wrestling by a Torreó-based wrestler known as Machist. In 1952 Cisnero made his debut as a luchador in San Pedro, Coahuila after training with wrestler El Buitre. He began as an enmascarado, or masked wrestler known as "La Furia" ("the Fury"). In his debut he teamed up with La Hiena Emmascarada, wrestling the team of Pokarito Ramírez and Ventarrón. Cisnero earned five Mexican peso for the match. He would late adopt a different ring name, becoming known as "Toro" Cisnero. While working as "Toro" Cisnero he began teaming up with Torbellino Vázquez, his childhood friend Eusebio Vázquez who had become a luchador as well.

In the late 1950s Vázquez adopted a new ring character, the masked wrestler, character El Espanto ("the Terror" or "The Horror"). As El Espanto he would wear all black and white ring gear, including a black mask with a broad, white cross on the front of the mask. A few months later Cisnero was given the character "Espanto II" (with Vázquez becoming "Espanto I") and thus the team of Los Hermano Espantos ("The Terror brothers") or Los Espantos was created. Ramos recommended Espanto I to the Mexico City promoters of Empresa Mexicana de Lucha Libre ("Mexican Wrestling Enterprise"; EMLL) where he made his EMLL debut on December 16, 1959 in EMLL's Arena Coliseo. While Espanto I worked in Mexico City, Espanto II was gaining more experience locally before being called up to Mexico City as well. Los Hermanos Espanto made their debut as a team on January 24, 1961, winning  a tag team tournament in their debut by defeating Tony López and Kiko Córcega in the finals. As a team they would remain undefeated for 34 weeks in a row on EMLL's regular Tuesday night show. Due to their success and fan reaction Los Espantos soon started working regularly on EMLL's Friday night Super Viernes show, EMLL's main show. During their run as a team they wrestled against Lou Thez, the visiting NWA World Heavyweight Champion, with Thez teaming up with Blue Demon on one occasion and Huracán Ramírez on another.

On June 12, 1962 Espanto II won his first ever Lucha de Apuestas, or "bet match", defeating Tomás Riande and thus forcing him to be shaved bald as a result. In lucha libre the Lucha de Apuesta victory is considered the highest "prize" that a wrestler can win, more so than championships. Two months later he won the hair of Álvaro Velazco in a match in Mexico City. Those two Apuesta matches were part of a buildup towards one of the feature matches of the 1st EMLL 30th Anniversary Show, held on September 6, 1963. At the show Rubén Juárez defeated Espanto II in a Lucha de Apuesta, forcing Espanto to unmask. After unmasking he gave his birth name as "Fernando Vázquez Cisneros", using a combination of his and his partners' paternal last names to maintain the story that the Espantos were brothers. A few weeks later Espanto I gained a measure of revenge for his team as he defeated Rubén Juárez as part of the 2nd EMLL 30th Anniversary Show. In November 1962 Espanto I and II were joined by Espanto III, Euseibo's younger brother Miguel, forming a regular trio. At the same time Espanto I and II also regularly teamed up with El Santo, often headlining EMLL shows across Mexico. Teaming with El Santo was part of a storyline where Espanto I and II would attack El Santo after a match, turning Santo to the tecnico side (those that portray the "good guys") in the process. On Jun 22, 1963, Espanto I, II and El Santo lost a match to Rito Romero, Rayo de Jalisco, and Henry Pilusso. Being disappointed with the loss Espanto II attacked El Santo, but ended up with his own mask torn up and his face covered in blood when El Santo fought back. In the buildup to the mask vs. mask match between Espanto I and El Santo, El Santo defeated Espanto II in a Lucha de Apuesta match in late 1963, forcing Espanto II to have all his hair shaved off. A couple of months later El Santo would unmask Espanto I, who also stated that his last name was "Vázquez Cisneros".

The Los Espantos trio got their biggest win when they defeated the "dream team" of Mexican tecnicos El Santo, Blue Demon and Mil Máscaras, sparking a long-running rivalry between the two trios. During that time period Los Espantos also formed a team with El Gladiador, often facing El Santo and various partners. One particularly heated match saw Los Espantos and El Gladiador fight their opponents, Ray Mendoza, René Guajardo, and Karloff Lagarde all the way back to the locker rooms in an era where such a thing was unheard of in Mexico. In June 1964 Blue Demon defeated Espanto II in a Lucha de Apuestas match, leaving him bald as a result. The following year Espanto II lost his hair to Blue Demon's long time tag team partner, Black Shadow. In 1966 Espanto I and II won the Mexican National Tag Team Championship from El Santo and Mil Máscaras, but would later lose the belts to El Santo and Mil Máscaras in a rematch.

On May 30, 1968, José Vázquez, as well as fellow wrestler Popeye Franco, were killed by the owner of a cantina during a bar fight. At the time of his death, Los Espantos were set to do a world tour with dates planned for Germany, France, Spain and Japan. The promoters offered Espanto II the opportunity to go alone or with Espanto III, but he declined due to the loss of his close friend. After the death of his brother, Miguel wrestled less regularly and by the early 1970s both Cisneros and Miguel Vázquez became semi-retired from wrestling, working only a limited schedule in Northern Mexico. As Espanto II and III, the duo held the Northern Tag Team Championship at one point in the 1970s before Espanto II retired in 1979.

Retirement and death
Cisnero wrestled his last match in 1979, losing to Gran Hamada in Monterrey, Nuevo León and then retired from in-ring competition. He did remain involved with professional wrestling, training several local Torreón wrestlers including Stuka Jr. Cisnero gave two of his students permission to become Los Hijos del Espanto ("The Sons of Espanto"), using the name and masks. in 1998 Cisneros, as the last surviving Espanto endorse the Mini-Estrella El Espantito ("The Little Terror"), to use the name and mask after having trained him years earlier.

Cisnero was married to Paula Reyes Cisnero and together they had five sons and sixteen grandchildren. Late in life Cisnero suffered from heart problems and had undergone surgery days prior to August 27, 2010. In the morning of the 27th, he suffered a relapse and was brought back to the hospital, but died shortly after.

Legacy
After the storyline with El Santo Los Espantos became one of the most reviled rudo trios in Lucha libre at the time. In 1999 the Mexican newspaper El Siglo de Torreón stated that the team of Espanto I and Espanto II was considered one of the best rudo teams in the history of lucha libre. The statement was echoed by Súper Luchas Magazine in 2010 when they wrote an obituary after Espanto II died. The Los Espantos trio influenced several subsequent teams and individual wrestlers to use the Espanto name, not just limited to his sons Espanto IV and V. In 1984 Vázquez and Cisneros allowed Jesús Andrade Salas to adopt the identify of "Espanto Jr.", who was presented as the son of Espanto I and wore the signature black and white mask of Los Espantos. Andrade would be succeeded by his son, who in 2012 also began working as Espanto Jr.

Championships and accomplishments
Empresa Mexicana de Lucha Libre
Mexican National Tag Team Championship (1 time) – with Espanto I
Chihuahua State wrestling
Northern Tag Team Championship (1 time) – with Espanto III
Ciudad Juárez Lucha Libre Hall of Fame (2010)

Luchas de Apuestas record

References

1932 births
2010 deaths
Mexican male professional wrestlers
Masked wrestlers
Professional wrestling trainers
Professional wrestlers from Coahuila
People from Torreón
20th-century professional wrestlers
Mexican National Tag Team Champions